Eoophyla inouei is a moth in the family Crambidae. It was described by Yoshiyasu in 1979. It is found in Japan (the Ryukyus).

References

Eoophyla
Moths described in 1979